Chaneysville is an unincorporated community in Southampton Township, southern Bedford County, Pennsylvania, United States.

References

External links
 Village of Chaneysville

Unincorporated communities in Bedford County, Pennsylvania